Christ's College is a constituent college of the University of Cambridge. The college includes the Master, the Fellows of the College, and about 450 undergraduate and 170 graduate students. The college was founded by William Byngham in 1437 as God's House. In 1505, the college was granted a new royal charter, was given a substantial endowment by Lady Margaret Beaufort, and changed its name to Christ's College, becoming the twelfth of the Cambridge colleges to be founded in its current form. Alumni of the college include some of Cambridge University’s most famous members, including Charles Darwin and John Milton.

Within Cambridge, Christ's has a reputation for high academic standards. It has averaged 1st place on the Tompkins Table from 1980 to 2006 and third place from 2006 to 2013, returning to first place in 2018, 2019 and 2022.

Simon McDonald is the college's current Master. Robert Evans is the chaplain; he was ordained in the Church of England.

History

Christ's College was founded by William Byngham in 1437 as God's House, on land which was soon after sold to enable the enlargement of King's College. Byngham obtained the first royal licence for God's House in July 1439. The college was founded to provide for the lack of grammar-school masters in England at the time, and the college has been described as "the first secondary-school training college on record". The original site of Godshouse was surrendered in 1443 to King's College, and currently about three-quarters of King's College Chapel stands on the original site of God's House.

After the original royal licence of 1439, three more licences, two in 1442 and one in 1446, were granted before in 1448 God's House received the charter upon which the college was in fact founded. In this charter, King Henry VI was named as the founder, and in the same year the college moved to its current site.

In 1505, the college was endowed by Lady Margaret Beaufort, mother of King Henry VII, and was given the name Christ's College, perhaps at the suggestion of her confessor, the Bishop John Fisher. The expansion in the population of the college in the seventeenth century led to the building, in the 1640s, of the Fellows' Building in what is now Second Court.

Buildings

The original 15th/16th century college buildings now form part of First Court, including the chapel, Master's Lodge and Great Gate tower. The gate itself is disproportionate: the bottom has been cut off to accommodate a rise in street level, which can be seen in the steps leading down to the foot of L staircase in the gate tower. The college hall, originally built at the very start of the 16th century, was restored in 1875–1879 by George Gilbert Scott the younger. The lawn of First Court is famously round, and a wisteria sprawls up the front of the Master's lodge.

Second Court is fully built up on only three sides, one of which is formed by the 1640s Fellows' Building. The fourth side backs onto the Master's garden.

The Stevenson Building in Third Court was designed by J. J. Stevenson in the 1880s and was extended in 1905 as part of the College's Quadcentenary. In 1947 Professor Albert Richardson designed a new cupola for the Stevenson building, and a second building, the neo-Georgian Chancellor's Building (W staircase, now known as The Blyth Building), completed in 1950. Third Court's Memorial Building (Y staircase), a twin of the Chancellor's building, also by Richardson, was completed in 1953 at a cost of £80,000. Third Court is also noted for its display of irises in May and June, a gift to the college in 1946.

The controversial tiered concrete New Court (often dubbed "the Typewriter") was designed in the Modernist style by Sir Denys Lasdun in 1966–70, and was described as "superb" in Lasdun's obituary in the Guardian. Design critic Hugh Pearman comments "Lasdun had big trouble relating to the street at the overhanging rear". It appears very distinctively in aerial photographs, forming part of the northern boundary of the college.

An assortment of neighbouring buildings have been absorbed into the college, of which the most notable is the Todd Building, previously Cambridge's County Hall.

Through an arch in the Fellows' Building is the Fellows' Garden. It includes two mulberry trees, of which the older was planted in 1608, the same year as Milton's birth. Both trees have toppled sideways, the younger tree in the Great Storm of 1987, and are now earthed up round the trunks, but continue to fruit every year.

Swimming pool

Christ's College is one of only 5 colleges in Oxford or Cambridge to have its own swimming pool. It is fed by water from Hobson's Conduit. Recently refurbished, it is now known as the 'Malcolm Bowie Bathing Pool', and is thought to be the oldest outdoor swimming pool in the UK, dating from the mid 17th century. The other four swimming pools within colleges belong to Girton College (indoor pool), Corpus Christi College (outdoor pool), Emmanuel College (outdoor pool) and Clare Hall (indoor pool).

Gallery

Plan of College

Academic profile

With a deserved reputation even within Cambridge for the highest academic standards, Christ's came first in the Tompkins Table's twentieth anniversary aggregate table, and between 2001 and 2007, it had a mean position of third. Academic excellence continues at Christ's, with 91% of students in 2013 gaining a first class degree or an upper second (II.i). This is significantly higher than the University average of 70%.

Christ's is noted for educating two of Cambridge's most famous alumni, the poet John Milton and the naturalist Charles Darwin, who, during the celebrations for the 800th anniversary of the University, were both placed at the foreground as two of the four most iconic individuals in the University's history. The college has also educated Nobel Laureates including Martin Evans, James Meade, Alexander R. Todd, Baron Todd and Duncan Haldane. It is the University's 6th largest producer of Nobel Prize winners.

Some of the college's other famous alumni include former archbishop of Canterbury Rowan Williams, theologian William Paley, historian Simon Schama, South African Prime Minister Jan Smuts, Lord Louis Mountbatten of Burma, medical doctor, scientist, and diplomat Davidson Nicol, and comedians John Oliver, Sacha Baron Cohen, and Andy Parsons.

Student life

The Junior Combination Room (JCR), represents the undergraduate students. It organises social and welfare events, and negotiates on the students' behalf on important issues. The JCR has a standing committee and a common room for all the students. The JCR's counterpart, the Middle Combination Room (MCR) represents the graduate students of the College, and has its own bar. The MCR organises regular Graduate Halls. A Garden Party is held by both the JCR and the MCR every June in the Fellows' Garden. The Senior Combination Room (SCR) is composed solely of fellows of the College and holds two feasts each year.

The Acting Chaplain of the college is Michael Dormandy.

Other societies in Christ's include:
 The Marguerites Club, one of the oldest surviving College societies, reformed in 1899 by Gilbert Jessop the then captain of CUCC. It is believed to have originally formed some ten years earlier, but was soon disbanded. Originally the society was confined to captains and secretaries or those with colours in three sports. Nowadays it is also known as a drinking society, as well as a club recognising sporting excellence. The name originated from the club's original blazer, which was navy blue in colour with the Foundress's 'rebus' or badge, signifying her name, embroidered on the pocket.
 Christ's College Boat Club, the oldest college sports club still active, having been founded in 1830. Like many other Cambridge Colleges, Christ's has its own boathouse on the banks of the Cam.
 Christ's College Rugby Football Club, founded in 1875 by Alfred Cort Haddon, who is considered the father of modern anthropology. In the 1960 Varsity Match, eight of the starting Cambridge team were students at Christ's and all of the side's points were scored by Christ's players. The CCRFC is nicknamed "The Brown Rings" after the brown and white hoops featured on the match kit.
 Christ's College Association Football Club, which prides itself on having won the inter-collegiate Cuppers competition more times than any other.
 Christ's Films, which uses the theatre to screen new films weekly
 Christ's Amateur Dramatic Society
 Christ's College Medical Society
 Christ's Politics Society
 Christ's College Music Society, founded 1710.
 Christ's College Chapel Choir

May Ball

Christ's, like most other Cambridge Colleges, also hosts a biennial May Ball in the time after undergraduate examinations which is by students commonly known as May Week. A separate society called "Christ's College May Ball Committee" is set up every two years to organise and direct this event. The 2010 May Ball, named "L'Esprit Nouveau", was held on 15 June 2010 and featured a 1920s Parisian theme, Two Door Cinema Club headlined the entertainment. The May Ball in June 2012 featured a Rio de Janeiro carnival theme. Other previous themes include Le Reve in 2002, Silhouette in 2004, Elysium in 2006 and 'The Jasmine Ball' in 2008.

The May Ball on Tuesday 17 June 2014 was hailed as one of the best May Balls of the year, coming close to perfection. It was themed "The Emerald City".

The May Ball on Tuesday 14 June 2016 was themed as Biophilia. In 2018 the theme was A Night's Tale. While the 2020 Ball was cancelled due to the COVID-19 Pandemic, the May Ball returned in 2022, themed as Mythos.

Grace

The College Grace is normally said before any dinner held in the Formal Hall of the College. Though the student body rises for the recitation of the Grace, Christ's is one of the only Colleges in Cambridge where the students do not rise when the Fellows enter and leave the Dining Hall. This is said to be the result of a historical conflict between the Students and Fellows at Christ's, who were on opposite sides during the English Civil War. The words of the Grace are as follows:

Notable people

Proctors of God's House
 1439–1451 William Byngham
 1451–1458 John Hurt
 1458–1464 William Fallan
 1464–1477 William Basset
 1477–1490 Ralph Barton
 1490–1505 John Sickling

Masters of Christ's

Notable alumni

References

Bibliography
 (account of the history of God's House, originally published in 1934)

External links

Official Christ's College website
Christ's JCR website 
Christ's MCR website
Christ's biennial May Ball 
Exhibition celebrating 400 years since the birth of John Milton
Cambridge 2000 — Christ's College photographs

 
Colleges of the University of Cambridge
Educational institutions established in the 1500s
1505 establishments in England
Denys Lasdun buildings
Grade I listed buildings in Cambridge
Grade I listed educational buildings